Untold: Breaking Point is a 2021 American biographical documentary film made for Netflix and directed by Chapman Way and Maclain Way.

Summary 
The film is the fifth in the nine-part Untold documentary film series. It's story focuses on the life and career of professional tennis star Mardy Fish, who was burdened by severe anxiety and mental health challenges, which changed his life on and off the court.

See also 
Roger Federer

References

External links 
 
 Official trailer

2021 films
2021 documentary films
Documentary films about sportspeople
Films about depression
American sports documentary films
American biographical films
Biographical documentary films
Documentary films about mental health
2020s English-language films
2020s American films
Netflix original documentary films